Hardware were an American funk supergroup consisting of Buddy Miles, Bootsy Collins and Stevie Salas.

It featured Mudbone Cooper, Bernard Fowler and George Clinton on backing vocals, and was produced by Bill Laswell. The group was originally called The Third Eye, but changed their name due to conflicts with another group. They released one album, entitled Third Eye Open in 1992.

References

Supergroups (music)
Funk rock musical groups
American funk musical groups
American musical trios
African-American rock musical groups